Government Hospital For Mental Care is run by Government of Andhra Pradesh located at Chinna Waltair, Visakhapatnam, India.

About
The Government Hospital for Mental Care was one of the earliest mental care hospitals. It was established in the year of 1871 with 94 patients. In the present day (2019) it has 300 beds, which will be enhanced to 450.

References 

Mental health organisations in India
Hospital buildings completed in 1894
Hospitals in Visakhapatnam
1871 establishments in India
Hospitals established in 1871